Pasargad Tehran Football Club was an Iranian football club based in Tehran, Iran. They competed in the 2010–11 Iran Football's 3rd Division.

Managers 
 Marijan Pušnik

Season-by-Season 

The table below shows the achievements of the club in various competitions.

References 

Football clubs in Iran
Sport in Tehran